Angelika Beatrice Bengtsson (born 20 March 1990) is a Swedish politician and a member of the Riksdag sitting in seat number 63 for the constituency of Blekinge County for the Sweden Democrats.

Bengtsson grew up in Malmö and was classically trained as a dancer and ballerina with the Royal Swedish Ballet. She has worked as a tour guide in the Alps and in October 2014, said she was studying to become an occupational therapist. Bengtsson was elected to the Riksdag in 2014 for the Sweden Democrats. In parliament she sits with the Committee on Culture and in 2020 was elected Deputy Chairwoman of the Nordic Council's Committee on Knowledge and Culture.

References 

Living people
Members of the Riksdag from the Social Democrats
1990 births
Politicians from Malmö
Members of the Riksdag from the Sweden Democrats
Swedish ballerinas
Swedish dancers
21st-century Swedish women politicians
Women members of the Riksdag
Members of the Riksdag 2014–2018
Members of the Riksdag 2018–2022
Members of the Riksdag 2022–2026